Punk-O-Rama was the title given to a series of ten compilation albums published by Epitaph Records. The first volume was released in 1994, the second in 1996, and the rest annually from 1998 to 2005. The albums included artists from Epitaph's roster as well as from its subsidiary label ANTI- and its partnership labels Hellcat Records and Burning Heart Records. In total the series included 257 songs contributed by 88 different artists.

Rancid and Pennywise are the only bands to appear on all 10 volumes. Scott Radinsky appears on all 10, 1 with Ten Foot Pole and 9 with Pulley.

As its title implied, the series featured mostly punk rock and various punk subgenres such as garage punk, hardcore punk, pop punk, post-hardcore, ska punk, skate punk, and street punk. However, as the series went on and the labels' rosters diversified, the music of the Punk-O-Rama compilations grew to include additional styles of music such as alternative hip hop, alternative rock, digital hardcore, emo, experimental music, garage rock, indie rock, metalcore, psychobilly, and screamo.

Artwork for the series was inconsistent over the first four installments, with cover art and layout provided by varying artists and designers. C. Martin provided artwork and layout for both the fifth and sixth volumes, though they had differing styles and themes. Nick Pritchard of Metrosea.com provided artwork and layout for the final four volumes of the series, which adopted a similar look and style.

Epitaph also organized several Punk-O-Rama tours featuring bands that had contributed to the compilations, such as Agnostic Front, All, The Distillers, Guttermouth, Millencolin, Straight Faced, and the Voodoo Glow Skulls. Occasionally these would be accompanied by special Punk-O-Rama tour sampler CDs that differed from the main. series of compilation albums. In 2003 the label published the DVD Punk-O-Rama: The Videos, Volume 1, including 22 music videos and "The Epitaph Story", a short film relating the history of the label. Though a second volume was never published, the subsequent ninth and tenth albums in the compilation series included DVDs of music videos as well.

In 2006 Epitaph announced the retirement of the Punk-O-Rama brand in favor of a new series titled Unsound, the less genre-specific title being more conducive to the label's expanding roster of musical styles. However, only one compilation was published under the Unsound banner before that series was also discontinued.

Releases

CDs

Punk-O-Rama (1994)

Punk-O-Rama is a compilation album released by Epitaph Records on November 18, 1994. Featuring twelve bands from the label's roster, the album was the first installment in the Punk-O-Rama series which continued until 2005.

Punk-O-Rama Vol. 2 (1996) 

Punk-O-Rama Vol. 2 is the second compilation album in the Punk-O-Rama series. This was the first entry to be released at a low price, so that it was more appealing for someone to buy to check out Epitaph's artists.

All of the songs were previously released with the exception of DFL's "Thought Control". Me First and the Gimme Gimmes' cover of Billy Joel's "Only the Good Die Young" made its CD debut here, as it was previously only available on Billy, a vinyl single released by the band.

Vans Warped Tour '97 Presents Punk-O-Rama 2.1 (1997)

A tour edition of this volume was released in conjunction with the 1997 Vans Warped Tour. The artwork and track listing are slightly modified. The track listing is as follows:

Punk-O-Rama III (1998) 

Punk-O-Rama III is the third compilation album in the Punk-O-Rama series.

This entry features two previously unreleased tracks, "We Threw Gasoline on the Fire and Now We Have Stumps for Arms and No Eyebrows" by NOFX and "Wake Up" by Pennywise. NOFX's track was later released on their rarities compilation 45 or 46 Songs That Weren't Good Enough to Go on Our Other Records. The European version has Undeclinable Ambuscade's track "7 Years" and takes off "Lozin' Must" by Millencolin.

Europe version

Punk-O-Rama 4: Straight Outta The Pit (1999)

Punk-O-Rama 4 is the fourth compilation album in the Punk-O-Rama series. This is the only entry to have a sub-title.

All of the tracks were previously released except the first track, "Fight It" by Pennywise.

This was the first entry to include bands from the Swedish Burning Heart Records label, which has its material distributed by Epitaph Records in North America.  It also includes a song from the Tom Waits album Mule Variations, which was released on Epitaph's indie rock label ANTI-.

Europe version
 "Fight It" – Pennywise – 2:15
 "Second Best" – Pulley – 1:49
 "Faster Than the World" – H2O – 2:17
 "1998" – Rancid – 2:46
 "Watch Me Play" – Heideroosjes – 2:26
 "Hopeless Romantic" – The Bouncing Souls – 2:07
 "The Getaway" – Ten Foot Pole – 3:41
 "Think the World" – ALL – 1:21
 "Snap Decision (At Rope's End)" – New Bomb Turks – 2:23
 "Generator" – Bad Religion – 3:19
 "I Will Deny" – Dwarves – 1:39
 "Let's Do This" – Straight Faced – 1:23
 "It's My Life" – Agnostic Front – 2:29
 "Panic" – Beatsteaks – 2:40
 "Theme From Eeviac" – Man Or Astro-Man? – 2:32
 "They Always Come Back" – Voodoo Glow Skulls – 3:23
 "Twisted" – Zeke – 1:56
 "Don't Panic" – Gas Huffer – 1:46
 "Big in Japan" – Tom Waits – 4:04
 "Someone to Love?" – Gentleman Jack Grisham – 2:52
 "A Life's Story" – Union 13 – 2:09
 "Picture This" – 98 Mute – 2:05
 "Lucky" – Osker – 2:14
 "The Best Place In The World To Leave" – I Against I – 1:04
 "Kids of the K-Hole" – NOFX – 4:49

Punk-O-Rama #5 (2000) 

Punk-O-Rama 5 is the fifth compilation album in the Punk-O-Rama series.

All of the tracks were previously released except for "Pump Up the Valium" by NOFX and "Problematic" by All. The latter two tracks were title tracks left off the bands' current albums at the time, NOFX's Pump Up the Valuum and ALL's Problematic. Also, NOFX's track was later released on the rarities compilation album 45 or 46 Songs That Weren't Good Enough to Go on Our Other Records.

"Secure Horizons" by Guttermouth was later rerecorded on their Covered With Ants record.
"Good Rats" by Dropkick Murphys was later rerecorded on their Sing Loud Sing Proud record.
The Rancid song "Poison" was a demo version of the song off their Rancid 5 record.

This is the only entry in the series not to include a song by Bad Religion.

Europe version

Punk-O-Rama 2001, Vol. 6 (2001) 

Punk-O-Rama 2001, Vol. 6 is the sixth compilation album in the Punk-O-Rama series.

The cover is a reference to a scene in the movie 2001: A Space Odyssey, as this was the release from the year 2001.

The US release of Punk-O-Rama Vol. 6 included a total of five previously unreleased tracks.  The unreleased tracks are "Blackeye" by Millencolin (US only), "We're Desperate" by Pennywise, "Original Me" by Descendents, "Let Me In" by Beatsteaks and "Bath of Least Resistance" by NOFX. Pennywise perform "We're Desperate" with Exene Cervenka, who is from  X which is the band that originally performed the song. "Original Me" was originally performed by ALL, which is the band the members of the Descendents formed when Milo Aukerman went to college. "Bath of Least Resistance" by NOFX was later released on their rarities compilation 45 or 46 Songs That Weren't Good Enough to Go on Our Other Records. "Blackeye" by Millencolin was later released in their album Home from Home, and was the only previously unreleased track to not appear on the UK release of Punk-O-Rama Vol. 6.

Punk-O-Rama 7 (2002) 

Punk-O-Rama 7 is the seventh compilation album in the Punk-O-Rama series.

 "Fingers Crossed" – Millencolin – 2:47
 "Wayfarer" – Hot Water Music – 2:58
 "Up for Sale" – The (International) Noise Conspiracy – 3:26
 "The World" – Pennywise – 2:26
 "Black City" – Division of Laura Lee – 3:36
 "Olympia, WA" – NOFX – 2:59
 "Addicts of Communication" – Randy – 2:00
 "Hooray for Me" – Pulley – 2:19
 "The Something Special" – The Bouncing Souls – 3:23
 "God Knows" – Beatsteaks – 2:34
 "The Defense" – Bad Religion – 3:54
 "The End" – Deviates – 2:02
 "Heroes from Our Past" – Dropkick Murphys – 3:30
 "Bob" – Rancid – 2:02
 "Wasted Words" – Death by Stereo – 3:33
 "Love to Be Hated" – Agnostic Front – 2:13
 "Outside Looking In" – 1208 – 2:46
 "M.A.D." – 98 Mute – 3:16
 "My Girlfriend" – Guttermouth – 2:35

Europe version
 "Fingers Crossed" – Millencolin – 2:47
 "Wayfarer" – Hot Water Music – 2:58
 "Up for Sale" – The (International) Noise Conspiracy – 3:26
 "The World" – Pennywise – 2:26
 "Black City" – Division of Laura Lee – 3:36
 "Olympia, WA" – NOFX – 2:59
 "Addicts of Communication" – Randy – 2:00
 "Hooray for Me" – Pulley – 2:19
 "The Something Special" – The Bouncing Souls – 3:23
 "God Knows" – Beatsteaks – 2:34
 "The Defense" – Bad Religion – 3:54
 "The End" – Deviates – 2:02
 "Heroes from Our Past" – Dropkick Murphys – 3:30
 "Bob" – Rancid – 2:02
 "Wasted Words" – Death by Stereo – 3:33
 "Love to Be Hated" – Agnostic Front – 2:13
 "Outside Looking In" – 1208 – 2:46
 "M.A.D." – 98 Mute – 3:16
 "My Girlfriend" – Guttermouth – 2:35
 "What's Left Of The Flag" – Flogging Molly – 3:39
 "We're All Fucked Up" – Heideroosjes – 3:17

Punk-O-Rama 8 (2003) 

Punk-O-Rama 8 is the eighth compilation album in the Punk-O-Rama series. It was released in 2003.

This is the only entry in the series to be a two-disc by containing two CDs. The entries following this had two discs, but they were one CD and one DVD.

The song "Quick Death" is on here in two different forms. The first is the original by Transplants, and the latter is a remix of that track by Error.

Disc one
 "I Am a Revenant" – The Distillers
 "Don't Call It a Comeback" – Motion City Soundtrack
 "Trusty Chords" – Hot Water Music
 "As Wicked" – Rancid
 "New Day" – The Bouncing Souls
 "The Greatest Fall (Of All Time)" – Matchbook Romance
 "The Idiots Are Taking Over" – NOFX
 "Who We Are" – Bad Religion
 "Trapped In" – Division of Laura Lee
 "Sink Venice" – Ikara Colt
 "Sweating Blood" – F-Minus
 "Makeshift Patriot" – Sage Francis
 "A New Morning, Changing Weather" – The (International) Noise Conspiracy
 "Welfare Problems" – Randy
 "Thickfreakness" – The Black Keys
 "Wasted Words" – Death By Stereo
Multimedia track

European Version does not include Wasted Words by Death By Stereo, but does include extra tracks:
Daddy's Little Defect - Sugarcult
Wish - Beatsteaks
The Struggle Continues - Looptroop

Disc two
 "Unstoppable" – Death By Stereo
 "Coup d'Etat" – Refused
 "Holiday in the Sun" – Pennywise
 "Gonna Be a Blackout Tonight" – Dropkick Murphys
 "Quick Death" – Transplants
 "Bird Sings Why the Caged I Knows" – Atmosphere
 "Train of Flesh" – Turbonegro
 "Incorporeal" – Tiger Army
 "Bowmore" – Millencolin
 "The Ocean Song" – Pulley
 "Contribution" – Guttermouth
 "Warpath" – Bombshell Rocks
 "Get This Right!" – Raised Fist
 "Lose Another Friend" – No Fun at All
 "Roll Around" – U.S. Bombs
 "Shattered Faith" – Bad Religion
 "Quick Death [Remix]" – Error

Punk-O-Rama Vol. 9 (2004) 

Punk-O-Rama Vol. 9 is the ninth compilation album in the Punk-O-Rama series.

This is the first of two entries to be released as a two-disc with a DVD. The DVD features current music videos by bands on the CD, with the exception of Randy and Converge who do not appear on the CD. Additionally, of the bands that appear on both the CD and the DVD, only The Bouncing Souls and Matchbook Romance have the same song on each, with "Sing Along Forever" and "Promise" respectively.

All of the tracks on the CD were previously released except "Seein' Diamonds" by Hot Water Music and "The Plague (live)" by Death By Stereo.

This is the only entry in the series not to include a song by NOFX.

This was one of the main albums where the now popular band Motion City Soundtrack first found their fame with the humorous video shown on the DVD.

CD
 "Social Suicide" – Bad Religion – 1:35
 "Ride the Wings of Pestilence" – From First to Last – 4:20
 "Sick Little Suicide" – The Matches – 4:17
 "The Keys to Life vs. 15 Minutes of Fame" – Atmosphere – 2:40
 "Now I Know" – Pennywise – 2:57
 "Throw Down" – Motion City Soundtrack – 3:12
 "Tropical London" – Rancid – 3:03
 "The Dirty Glass" – Dropkick Murphys – 3:37
 "Plea from a Cat Named Virtute" – The Weakerthans – 3:49
 "Promise" – Matchbook Romance – 4:16
 "City in the Sea" – Scatter the Ashes – 4:22
 "Liberation Frequency" – Refused – 4:11
 "Struck By a Wrecking Ball" – Nekromantix – 3:28
 "Bad Reputation" – Pulley – 2:53
 "Fall Apart" – 1208 – 3:08
 "Sing Along Forever" – The Bouncing Souls – 1:35
 "Seein' Diamonds" – Hot Water Music – 3:36
 "Life Goes By" – The Special Goodness – 2:45
 "Miss Take (Radio Edit)" – HorrorPops – 3:06
 "Temptation" – Tiger Army – 2:10
 "Dirty Love" – Division Of Laura Lee – 3:11
 "Burn in Hell" – Error – 3:04
 "Now" – Eyedea & Abilities – 4:21
 "The Plague (live)" – Death By Stereo – 2:58

DVD
 "Sing Along Forever" – The Bouncing Souls 	
 "Miss Take" – HorrorPops 	
 "Trying to Find a Balance" – Atmosphere 	
 "Insects Destroy" – Pulley 	
 "The Next Big Thing" – 1208 	
 "Promise" – Matchbook Romance 	
 "The Future Freaks Me Out" – Motion City Soundtrack 	
 "Psalm for the Future for the Elks Lodge Last Call" – The Weakerthans 	
 "X-Ray Eyes" – Randy
 "NFA" – The Special Goodness 	
 "Heartless" – Converge
 "Hand In Hand" - Beatsteaks

Punk-O-Rama 10 (2005) 

Punk-O-Rama 10 is the tenth and final compilation album in the Punk-O-Rama series. The following year saw the start of Epitaph Records' new compilation series called Unsound.

This is one of only two, along with the previous entry, to be released as a two-disc with a DVD. The DVD features current music videos by bands on the CD, with the exception of C. Aarme, the Weakerthans, the Black Keys, Atmosphere, Horrorpops and Eyedea & Abilities who do not appear on the CD. Additionally, of the bands that appear on both the CD and the DVD, only the Bouncing Souls and Roger Miret and the Disasters have the same song on each, with "Anchors Aweigh" and "Riot, Riot, Riot" respectively.

Although most of the tracks on the CD were previously released, this entry features more unreleased tracks than any other in the series. "Shoot Me in the Smile" by The Matches, "News From The Front" by Bad Religion (however, the song was a bonus track on certain regional releases of Stranger Than Fiction), "Mixin' Up Adjectives" by This Is Me Smiling, "From the Tops of Trees" by Scatter the Ashes, "Mission from God" by The Offspring, "Bloodstain" by Pulley and "Not the Way" by The Special Goodness" were all previously unreleased as was the live version of "Anchors Aweigh" by The Bouncing Souls. Additionally, "There's No Fun in Fundamentalism" by NOFX made its CD debut here, as it was previously only available on one of the 7" of the Month Club vinyl singles.

CD

 When "You're" Around – Motion City Soundtrack
 Lovers & Liars – Matchbook Romance
 Shoot Me in the Smile – The Matches
 Failure By Designer Jeans – From First to Last
 Sun Vs. Moon – Sage Francis
 News From The Front – Bad Religion
 Mixin' Up Adjectives – This Is Me Smiling
 Shadowland – Youth Group
 From the Tops of Trees – Scatter the Ashes
 I Need Drugs – Some Girls
 Mince Meat – Dangerdoom
 Mission From God – The Offspring
 Black Cloud – Converge
 Last Goodbyes – Hot Water Music
 Anchors Aweigh (Live) – The Bouncing Souls
 Farewell My Hell – Millencolin
 The Warrior's Code – Dropkick Murphys
 Dead Weight Falls – The Unseen
 White Knuckle Ride – Rancid
 Falling Down – Pennywise
 No Fun in Fundamentalism – NOFX
 Bloodstain – Pulley
 Not the Way – The Special Goodness
 Ghostfire – Tiger Army
 Riot, Riot, Riot – Roger Miret and the Disasters
 Laugh/Love/Fuck – The Coup

DVD
 "Ride the Wings of Pestilence" – From First to Last 	
 "My Eyes Burn" – Matchbook Romance 	
 "Ray" – Millencolin 	
 "Skeleton Jar" – Youth Group 	
 "Eagles Become Vultures" – Converge 	
 "Tu Puta Mi Casa" – C. Aarme
 "Roses of the Devil's Garden" – Tiger Army 	
 "Chain Me Free" – The Matches 	
 "Los Angeles Is Burning" – Bad Religion 	
 "Ride the Fence" – The Coup	
 "Caesura" – Scatter the Ashes 	
 "The Reasons" – The Weakerthans
 "10 AM Automatic" – The Black Keys
 "National Disgrace" – Atmosphere
 "Miss Take" – HorrorPops
 "Tessie" – Dropkick Murphys 	
 "Anchors Aweigh" – The Bouncing Souls 	
 "Insects Destroy" – Pulley 	
 "Riot Riot Riot" – Roger Miret and the Disasters 	
 "Glass" – Eyedea & Abilities
 "NFA" – The Special Goodness

Unsound (2006) 

Unsound is the first, and currently only, compilation released in the Unsound series, which replaced Epitaph Records' Punk-O-Rama series. Epitaph chose to change the name of the compilation series because the name "Punk-O-Rama", especially in its later releases, no longer reflected the wide range of music released on the compilations. Unsound is similar to the last two entries in the Punk-O-Rama series in that it is a two-disc set with a CD and a DVD, which contains music videos of bands on the CD.

CD
 "The Latest Plague" – From First to Last – 3:18
 "Situations" – Escape the Fate – 3:06
 "Little Maggots" – The Matches – 2:43
 "Forever Young [Radio Edit]" – Youth Group – 3:24
 "Attractive Today" – Motion City Soundtrack – 1:41
 "Surrender" – Matchbook Romance – 4:47
 "I Am the Wind, You Are The Feather" – Vanna – 3:45
 "Last Light" – Converge – 3:34
 "Hot Piss" – Some Girls – 1:03
 "Pretty People Never Lie, Vampires Never Die" – I Am Ghost – 4:32
 "Benzie Box" – DANGERDOOM – 3:00
 "Los Angeles Is Burning" – Bad Religion – 3:21
 "The Gold Song" – The Bouncing Souls – 3:16
 "Knocked Down" – Pennywise – 2:43
 "New Eyes Open" – The Draft – 3:32
 "The Buzz Kill (Reanimator Remix)" – Sage Francis – 4:45
 "The Latest Plague (Atticus Remix)" – From First to Last – 3:42

DVD
 "The Latest Plague" – From First to Last 	 
 "Monsters" – Matchbook Romance 	 
 "Hold Me Down" – Motion City Soundtrack 	 
 "Chain Me Free" – The Matches 	 
 "Bone Metal" – Some Girls 	 
 "Shadowland" – Youth Group 	 
 "Escape Artist" – Sage Francis 	 
 "A.T.H.F." – Danger Doom 	 
 "Los Angeles Is Burning" – Bad Religion 	 
 "You Don't Have to Shout" – The Robocop Kraus

DVDs
 Punk-O-Rama: The Videos, Volume 1 (2003)
 Punk-O-Rama Vol. 9 (2004) – included with CD release
 Punk-O-Rama 10 (2005) – included with CD release

Artists
A total of 88 artists contributed songs to the Punk-O-Rama compilation series. Pennywise and Rancid were the only acts to appear on all ten volumes, while Bad Religion, NOFX, and Pulley each appeared on nine installments. Scott Radinsky appears on all 10, 1 with Ten Foot Pole and 9 with Pulley.

Contributing artists included:

59 Times the Pain
98 Mute
1208
Agnostic Front
All
Atmosphere
Bad Religion
Beatsteaks
The Black Keys
Bombshell Rocks
The Bouncing Souls
The Business
C.AARMÉ
Converge
The Coup
The Cramps
Danger Doom
Death by Stereo
Descendents
DFL
Deviates
The Distillers
Division of Laura Lee
Down by Law
Downset
Dropkick Murphys
Dwarves
Error
Eyedea & Abilities
F-Minus

Sage Francis
From First to Last
Gas Huffer
Jack Grisham
Guttermouth
H2O
The Hives
HorrorPops
Hot Water Music
The Humpers
I Against I
Ikara Colt
The (International) Noise Conspiracy
The Joykiller
Wayne Kramer
Madball
Matchbook Romance
The Matches
Me First and the Gimme Gimmes
Millencolin
Roger Miret and the Disasters
Motion City Soundtrack
Nekromantix
New Bomb Turks
No Fun at All
NOFX
The Offspring
Osker
Pennywise
Poison Idea

Pulley
Raised Fist
Rancid
Randy
Red Aunts
Refused
Satanic Surfers
Scatter the Ashes
SNFU
Some Girls
The Special Goodness
Straight Faced
Ten Foot Pole
This Is Me Smiling
Tiger Army
Total Chaos
Transplants
T.S.O.L.
Turbonegro
Union 13
The Unseen
U.S. Bombs
Vision
Voodoo Glow Skulls
Tom Waits
The Weakerthans
Youth Group
Zeke

References

Epitaph Records compilation albums
Punk rock compilation albums